Dája Bedáňová (born Daniela Bedáňová 9 March 1983) is a former professional tennis player from the Czech Republic. She lives in Leonberg, Germany. Bedáňová turned pro in 2000 and retired in 2005.

She was named the WTA Newcomer of the Year in 2000. Her best performance at a Grand Slam tournament came when she got to the quarterfinals of the 2001 US Open, defeating Joannette Kruger, Silvija Talaja, Meghann Shaughnessy and Monica Seles, then losing to Martina Hingis. She attained a career high ranking of 16 in singles in 2002.

Performance timelines 

Only main-draw results in WTA Tour, Grand Slam tournaments, Fed Cup and Olympic Games are included in win–loss records.

Singles

Doubles

WTA career finals

Singles: 1 (title)

Doubles: 2 (1 title, 1 runner-up)

ITF finals

Singles: 1 (title)

Doubles: 4 (2 titles, 2 runner-ups)

Best Grand Slam results details

External links
 
 
 

1983 births
Hopman Cup competitors
Czech expatriate sportspeople in Germany
Czech female tennis players
Living people
People from Leonberg
Sportspeople from Stuttgart (region)
Sportspeople from Ostrava
Wimbledon junior champions
US Open (tennis) junior champions
Tennis players at the 2000 Summer Olympics
Grand Slam (tennis) champions in girls' doubles
Olympic tennis players of the Czech Republic